Hip Hug-Her is the fifth studio album by the Southern soul band Booker T. & the M.G.'s, released on Stax Records in June 1967. The title track was the band's most successful single since their debut, "Green Onions" while their cover of the Young Rascals song "Groovin was also a hit (number 10 R&B, number 21 pop). The album was their last to be produced by Stax co-founder Jim Stewart, because the band started to produce themselves starting with Doin' Our Thing. The title track Hip Hug-Her is featured during the opening credits of the feature film Barfly (1987) with Mickey Rourke and Faye Dunaway..

Track listing
All tracks composed by Booker T & the MGs (Steve Cropper, Donald Dunn, Al Jackson Jr., Booker T. Jones), except where noted.
Side one
 "Hip Hug-Her" – 2:22
 "Soul Sanction" – 2:30
 "Get Ready" (William Robinson) – 2:45
 "More" (Riz Ortolani, Nino Oliviero, Marcello Ciorciolini, Norman Newell) – 2:55
 "Double or Nothing" – 2:51
 "Carnaby St." – 2:14
Side two
 "Slim Jenkins' Place" – 2:25
 "Pigmy" (Mel Brown, Billy Larkin, Hank Swarn) – 3:55
 "Groovin' (Eddie Brigati, Felix Cavaliere) – 2:40
 "Booker's Notion" – 2:25
 "Sunny" (Bobby Hebb) – 3:24

"Slim Jenkins' Place" was originally titled "Slim Jenkins' Joint".

Personnel
Booker T. & the M.G.s
Booker T. Jones - Hammond organ, piano
Steve Cropper - guitar, piano on "Groovin'", claves on "Booker's Notion"
Donald Dunn - bass guitar
Al Jackson Jr. - drums, percussion
Technical
Loring Eutemey - cover design
George Rosenblatt - cover photography

Charts

Singles

References

External links
 [ Review of "Hip Hug-Her"] at Allmusic

1967 albums
Booker T. & the M.G.'s albums
Stax Records albums
Atlantic Records albums
Albums produced by Jim Stewart (record producer)